Different Dreams  is a 2019 South Korean television series starring Lee Yo-won, Yoo Ji-tae, Lim Ju-hwan and Nam Gyu-ri. It aired four episodes every Saturday on MBC TV from 20:45 to 23:10 (KST), from May 4 to July 13, 2019.

The series celebrates the 100th anniversary of the March 1st Movement which led to the formation of the Provisional Government of the Republic of Korea in 1919.

Synopsis
The story takes place in Gyeongseong (South Korea) and Shanghai (China) during the Japanese colonial rule of Korea. Lee Young-jin is a Korean surgeon who was raised by a Japanese family. She becomes a spy for the Korean government.

Cast

Main
 Lee Yo-won as Lee Young-jin (36 years old)
 Yoo Ji-tae as Kim Won-bong (39 years old)
 Lim Ju-hwan as Fukuda (32 years old)
 Nam Gyu-ri as Miki (29 years old)

Supporting

People around Lee Young-jin
 Lee Hae-young as Hiroshi
 Lee Young-sook as Kim Hyun-ok
 Kim Tae-woo as Yoo Tae-joon
 Yoon Ji-hye as Esther

Heroic Corps
 Jo Bok-rae as Kim Nam-ok
 Baek Su-ho as Majar
 Park Ha-na as Cha Jeong-im
 Lee Kyu-ho as Yoon Se-ju
 Heo Ji-won as Park Hyeok
 Kim Joo-young as Kim Seung-jin

Joseon Governor Office
 Jeon Jin-ki as Oda
 Seol Jung-hwan as Ma Roo (Maru)
 Ahn Shin-woo as Kenta
 Yu Sang-jae as Roku

Jongno Police Station
 Heo Sung-tae as Matsuura
 Kang Pil-sun as Daiki
 Lee Kyo-yeob as Matsuda
 Yoon Joon-sung as Kimura
 Park Seon-woong as Taro

Joseon Governor Office Hospital
 Yoon Jong-hwa as Ishida
 Kim Kyu-jong as Seong Joon-soo

Cheongbang
 Kim Beob-rae as Do Wol-seong
 Jung Sung-il as Jin-soo
 Lee Sun-jin as Lee So-min

Others
 Sora Jung as Yu Madam
 Yoo Ha-bok as Kim Gu
 Kim Do-hyun as Murai
 Kim Sook-in as Macey
 Lee Han-wi as Song Byung-soo

Production
 Lee Young-ae was supposed to portray Lee Young-jin but she withdrew from the television series due to schedule conflicts.
 The series is entirely pre-produced. Filming began in October 2018 and wrapped up on April 28, 2019.
 The drama also serves as a reunion project for both Lee Yo-won and Nam Gyu-ri who both starred in the 2011 hit drama 49 Days.

Original soundtrack

Part 1

Part 2

Part 3

Part 4

Part 5

Part 6

Part 7

Part 8

Part 9

Part 11

Ratings
 In this table,  represent the lowest ratings and  represent the highest ratings.
 NR denotes that the drama did not rank in the top 20 daily programs on that date.
 N/A denotes that the rating is not known.

Notes

References

External links
  
 
 

Korean-language television shows
MBC TV television dramas
Television series set in Korea under Japanese rule
South Korean historical television series
Television series set in the 1930s
South Korean melodrama television series
South Korean pre-produced television series
2019 South Korean television series debuts
2019 South Korean television series endings